Metal is second album released by American heavy metal band Manilla Road in 1982.

Track listing

 "Enter the Warrior" - 5:18
 "Defender" - 2:02
 "Queen of the Black Coast" - 4:23
 "Metal" - 6:10
 "Out of Control with Rock & Roll" - 4:15
 "Cage of Mirrors" - 8:40
 "Far Side of the Sun" - 4:55

Credits
Manilla Road 
 Mark Shelton - Lead vocals, 6- and 12- string guitars
 Scott Park - bass Guitar
 Rick Fisher - drums and percussion, backing vocals

Production
Music Forward Group - artwork

References

 

Manilla Road albums
1982 albums